Agriculture in Algeria composes 25% of Algeria's economy and 12% of its GDP in 2010. Prior to Algeria’ colonization in 1830, nonindustrial agriculture provided sustenance for its population of approximately 2-3 million. Domestic agriculture production included wheat, barley, citrus fruits, dates, nuts, and olives. After 1830, colonizers introduced 2200 individual farms operated by private sectors. Colonial farmers continued produce a variety of fruits, nuts, wheat, vegetables. Algeria became a large producer of wine during the late 19th century due to a crop epidemic that spread across France. Algeria's agriculture evolved after independence was achieved in 1962. The industry experienced multiple policy changes modernize and decry on food imports. Today, Algeria's agriculture industry continues to expand modern irrigation and size of cultivable land.

Despite Algeria's geographical size, less than 4% of its total land area is cultivable. Prior to 1987, all cultivable land was possessed by the state. The state divided this land into sections recognized as the domains agricoles socialistes. These farms were abolished after 1987 and the state sold the cultivable land to individuals. However, the government of Algeria retains control over one third of all cultivable land.

Production 

Algeria produced, in 2018:

 4.6 million tonnes of potato (17th largest producer in the world);
 3.9 million tonnes of wheat;
 2 million tons of watermelon (6th largest producer in the world);
 1.9 million tons of barley (18th largest producer in the world);
 1.4 million tons of onion (16th largest producer in the world);
 1.3 million tons of tomato (18th largest producer in the world);
 1.1 million tons of orange (14th largest producer in the world);
 1 million tons of date (4th largest producer in the world, second only to Egypt, Saudi Arabia and Iran);
 860 thousand tons of olives (6th largest producer in the world);
 651 thousand tons of pepper;
 502 thousand tons of grape;
 431 thousand tons of carrot;
 388 thousand tons of pumpkin;
 262 thousand tons of tangerine;
 242 thousand tons of apricot (4th largest producer in the world, second only to Turkey, Iran and Uzbekistan);
 207 thousand tons of cauliflower and broccoli;
 202 thousand tons of garlic;
 200 thousand tons of pear;
 193 thousand tons of cucumber;
 190 thousand tons of peach;
 186 thousand tons of pea;
 181 thousand tons of aubergine;
 124 thousand tons of artichoke (5th largest producer in the world, losing only to Italy, Egypt, Spain and Peru);
 118 thousand tons of oats;
 111 thousand tons of plum (20th largest producer in the world);
 109 thousand tons of fig (4th largest producer in the world, second only to Turkey, Egypt and Morocco);

In addition to smaller productions of other agricultural products.

Agriculture prior to colonialism 
Prior to the colonial period, Algerian agriculture produced fruits, nuts, and vegetables using nonindustrial methods. Most of Algeria's agriculture is produced in the east on the plains around Bejaia and Annaba. Agriculture workers sustained Algeria's population of two to three million people without importing high quantities of food. However, following Algeria's population surge during and after the colonial period, Algeria imported high quantities of wheat, dairy, and meat.

Agriculture during colonialism 

Algeria's agriculture system was not profitable for France during the colonial period, except during the vineyard epidemic of the 1880s. This lack of profit is marked by the Bank of Algeria's refusal to offer credit to industrial farms in Algeria.  During this period, however, Algeria continued to produce fruits, vegetables, wine, and animals to sustain its population. However, during the epidemic, Algeria became a major producer of wine.

During the colonial period, Algeria was transformed into “an enormous vineyard”. Vineyards were limited during the early stages of colonialism. Farmers often only grew vineyards for personal and social consumption near their other crops. France's prolific metropolitan gardens did not necessitate wine imports from its North African colonies. However, Algeria's role in wine production transformed during the late nineteenth century. Phylloxera gripped vineyards across France and sparked an agricultural epidemic. This epidemic struck France at an inopportune time as it was evolving into a world leader for wine exports. France's economy plummeted and the agricultural sector began searching for opportunities.

The French government incentive farmers in Algeria to produce wine to combat the epidemic that was spreading across French vineyards. Algerian Agriculture workers began expanding their vineyards across the country. Large quantities of wine flowed from Algeria to France and to other countries across the world. Algeria developed a reputation for growing high quality and extensive types of wine. However, Algeria's role as a leader in wine production was short lived. France's vineyards recovered in the following decades and it lessened its reliance on Algerian wine exports.

Agriculture post colonialism 
After independence was achieved in 1962 colonial farms were replaced by laborers. 2200 farms operated by colonizers were now operated by work laborers who had previously worked on the farms. The term autogestion was used to describe that the farms were self managed. Wage laborers continued to follow the farming practices used by the French, which includes the use of farming machines and chemical enhancers. Following the model established by the French permitted Algerian farmers to export their products to international markets. However, these private farms yielded lower quantities of produce due to the unstable government and lack of workers.

After Algeria achieved independence, the French government assured Algerian farmers they would purchase reserves of its wine and other produce. However, France's agriculture sector pressured the government to source wine internally and rescind contracts with Algeria. Cancelled contracts created an oversupply of wine in Algeria. The Soviet Union purchased high quantities of wine from Algeria in the 1970s, but this did not alleviate Algeria's oversupply of wine.

This period consisted of private corporation and individuals owning and operating farms in Algeria. Algeria's model was an extension of the previous French model, although the French farmers were replaced by Algerian companies and Algerian citizens, including peasants who tilled the land during the colonial regime. Although individuals had access to purchase and operate farms, private companies owned the majority of farms. Inequitable distribution of farms in Algeria inspired an agriculture revolution.

Post agrarian revolution and contemporary efforts 

Disenchanted the Algeria's low production yield and large dependency on international imports for food, the government launched an agriculture revitalization program at the beginning of the 1980. The government recognized that the previous model introduced during the agrarian revolution was unsuccessful and harmful to the agriculture industry. Algeria's Ministry of Agriculture withdrew socialist control of the agriculture industry and reintroduced the private sector into the agriculture industry. New policy allowed private corporations to purchase farmable land and introduce independent techniques. This change marked a shift from a socialist program to a market place strategy.

From 1987 to 1999, the ministry of agriculture continued to lessen the state's control over the agriculture industry. The state maintained approximately one third control of cultivable land in Algeria, however it continued to allow the private sector to invest and take control over the industry. This is marked by the private sector's ability to purchase farming resources independently and hire workers of their own liking. In addition the government allowed private companies to develop their own contracts with farming networks. This resulted in an expansion of the industry and increase in quality production.

Further steps to develop the agriculture sector includes investments from the public sector increasing from 10% to 15%. The government also pledged in the 1990s to expand modern irrigation to 20 000 hectares of land. Reliance on rainwater was detrimental to the industry's success; Algeria's inconsistent crop yield and quality dissuaded countries to sign contracts with Algerian farmers. Modern irrigation systems allow the agriculture industry to develop stable relationships with foreign trade networks. Previously the Algerian government was unable to secure stable relationships with international partners because of their inability to produce consistent levels and qualities of product. But a change was occurring, and Algeria was showing the agriculture industry that it was just as deserving to have contracts as other countries. Algeria acted on its need to modernize its agriculture industry to compete with other countries.

Changes have had positive impacts on both Algeria's economy and Algeria's ability to provide food to its population. Prior to reform in the agricultural sector, Algeria's ministry of agriculture was unable to provide locally grown food for its population. Algeria imported 85% of its food from other countries, marking it as one of the largest food importers in the world. However, following the government's investment in agriculture, Algeria has substantially decreased its reliance on imported of food. Algeria produces 100% of its domestic consumption of potatoes, tomatoes, and meat. Employment numbers in the agriculture sector have increased by 120% from 2000 to 2004.

Employment in agriculture in comparison with Algeria's total labor force steadily declined after independence was achieved. In the 1970s, 64% of the total labor force worked in agriculture. As of  2000, this number has declined to 24%. Decline in agriculture is largely attributed to Algeria's reliance on imported food after the end of

Agriculture in Algeria contributes about 12% of Algeria's gross domestic product while employing 20% of the rural population in all aspects of raising crops on 8.5 million hectares of arable land. Most of Algeria is arid desert (the Sahara) and semi-arid lands, with low and unreliable rainfall, and few crops can be grown here. The Atlas Mountain ranges in the north separate the Sahara and high desert from the Mediterranean coast, and most crops are grown on lands in the foothills and along the coast. Therefore, most arable land, only 3.5% of the total surface of Algeria, is under a Mediterranean climate, where droughts are common and rainfall is unevenly and unreliably distributed throughout the year. Algerian agriculture depends mostly upon rainfall rather than irrigation, and irrigation projects are often of limited scope. The most common crops are cereals (wheat, oat, and barley) and pulses. The most commonly raised livestock are sheep and goat, then cattle. Chickens are common in rural areas. Algeria is a net importer of food.

Large quantities of crin vegetal (vegetable horse-hair), an excellent fibre, are made from the leaves of the dwarf palm. The olive, both for its fruit and oil, and tobacco are cultivated with great success.

Algeria also exports figs, dates, esparto grass and cork. It is the largest oat market in Africa.

Wine production

Throughout arable lands in Algeria the soil favours the growth of vines. The country, in the words of an expert sent to report on the subject by the French government,
"can produce an infinite variety of wines suitable to every constitution and to every caprice of taste".

The growing of vines was undertaken early by the colonists, but it was not until vineyards in France were attacked by phylloxera that the export of wine from Algeria became significant. In 1883, despite precautionary measures, Algerian vineyards were also attacked but in the meantime the quality of their wines had been proved. In 1850, less than 2,000 acres (8 km2) were devoted to the grape, but in 1878, this had increased to over 42,000 acres (170 km2), which yielded 7,436,000 gallons (28,000 m³) of wine. Despite bad seasons and ravages of insects, cultivation extended, and in 1895, the vineyards covered 300,000 acres (1,200 km2), the produce being 88,000,000 gallons (333,000 m³). The area of cultivation in 1905 exceeded 400,000 acres (1,600 km2), and in that year the amount of wine produced was 157,000,000 gallons (594,000 m³). By that time the limits of profitable production had been reached in many parts of the country. Practically the only foreign market for Algerian wine is France, which in 1905 imported about 110,000,000 gallons (416,000 m³).

The Algerian body responsible for wine cultivation is called the National Office of Marketing of Wine Products (ONCV).

References

Further reading